Laura Münkler (born 1985) is a German professor for public law and healthcare law at Greifswald University.

Life 
Laura Münkler was born into a family of scholars in Friedberg, Hesse. She is the daughter of political scientist Herfried Münkler and literary scholar . In 2004 she passed the Abitur before taking up legal studies at Humboldt University of Berlin. She also passed both legal Staatsexamen in 2009 and 2011 at Berlin.

From 2009 until 2012, Laura Münkler was a research fellow at Humboldt University and a DAAD lecturer at the Paris Nanterre University.

In 2014 she was awarded a doctorate. Her dissertation thesis was awarded both the faculty prize and the prize of Münchener Juristische Gesellschaft.

Laura Münkler was habilitated in 2020 in public law, healthcare law and legal theory and in the same year became a professor at Greifswald University. Her habilitation thesis deals with the relationship between experts, politics, and the law. Münkler argues the supremacy of law and politics over what the experts say must prevail because in the end it is a political matter how to deal with an expert's opinion of any other faculty.

Writings 

 Kosten-Nutzen-Bewertungen in der gesetzlichen Krankenversicherung. Eine Perspektive zur Ausgestaltung des krankenversicherungsrechtlichen Wirtschaftlichkeitsgebots?, Schriftenreihe zum Gesundheitsrecht Band 33, 357 Seiten, Duncker & Humblot, Berlin, 2015 (Dissertation), ISBN 978-3-428-14471-6.

External links 

 
 Laura Münkler at Greifswald University
 Laura Münkler Ludwig Maximilian University of Munich

References 

1985 births
Living people
Humboldt University of Berlin alumni
21st-century German lawyers
Academic staff of the University of Greifswald
Academic staff of the Ludwig Maximilian University of Munich
People from Friedberg, Hesse